Scaevola repens  is a shrub in the family Goodeniaceae, endemic to the south west of Western Australia.

Description
Scaevola repens is a prostrate shrub with branches up to 50 cm long.  The leaves are stalkless, and have smooth edges, and may be with or without prominent axillary hairs. The leaf blade is up to 90 mm long by 15 mm wide. The flowers occur in axillary spikes which are up  to 30 mm long. The  bracts are like leaves but smaller. The sepals are  rim-like and up to 1 mm long. The corolla is 8-15 mm long, and has dense, appressed, golden or yellowish hairs on the outside,  and is hairy on the inside on both the lobes and the throat and is  white to cream and sometimes (rarely) mauve.  The fruit is ovoid, and about 4 mm long and warty.

It differs  from other Scaevola species that have flowers in axillary spikes, by having hairs on the outside of the corolla, which are yellow to almost golden.

Taxonomy and naming
It was first described and named by the Dutch botanist, Willem Hendrik de Vriese in 1845, describing it from a specimen collected in 1839 from "sandy woods near the city of Perth" (specimen 1519 in the Ludwig Preiss herbarium).  The specific epithet, repens, derives from  the Latin verb, repere, (to creep) to give a Botanical Latin adjective which describes the plant as  "creeping" or having "creeping stems".

Distribution 
It is found in the IBRA Regions of the  Avon Wheatbelt, the Geraldton Sandplains, the Jarrah Forest,  and the Swan Coastal Plain., or (using Beard's provinces) in the South-West Province

References

repens
Flora of Western Australia

Plants described in 1845
Taxa named by Willem Hendrik de Vriese
.